Beautiful Minds is the first collaborative album from rappers Killah Priest and Chief Kamachi.

Track listing

2008 albums
Killah Priest albums